George Lambert (September 1, 1928 – January 30, 2012) was an American modern pentathlete who competed in the 1956 Summer Olympics and in the 1960 Summer Olympics.

References

1928 births
2012 deaths
American male modern pentathletes
Modern pentathletes at the 1956 Summer Olympics
Modern pentathletes at the 1960 Summer Olympics
Olympic silver medalists for the United States in modern pentathlon
Olympic bronze medalists for the United States in modern pentathlon
People from Hampton, Iowa
Sportspeople from Iowa
Medalists at the 1960 Summer Olympics
Medalists at the 1956 Summer Olympics
Pan American Games silver medalists for the United States
Pan American Games medalists in modern pentathlon
Pan American Games gold medalists for the United States
Competitors at the 1959 Pan American Games
Medalists at the 1959 Pan American Games
20th-century American people
21st-century American people